Johnny Juul Thomsen (born 26 February 1982) is a Danish football midfielder who plays for Danish amateur club Fredericia KFUM.

Before this he played in F.C. Copenhagen, SønderjyskE and FC Fredericia. Thomsen has gained 3 caps for the Danish national team.

Career
Johnny played his first match with F.C. Copenhagen against his former club SønderjyskE.

In the start of 2012 he was released from his contract in Copenhagen and signed a new 4 year long contract with Randers FC.

After a long career, Thomsen decided to retire from professional football and in June 2021, he re-joined the club where it all began, Fredericia KFUM.

External links

 National team profile

References

Living people
1985 births
Danish men's footballers
Denmark international footballers
SønderjyskE Fodbold players
F.C. Copenhagen players
Randers FC players
Danish Superliga players
People from Fredericia
Association football midfielders
Association football defenders
Sportspeople from the Region of Southern Denmark